The Anglican Church of St Michael and All Angels in Chaffcombe, Somerset, England was built in the 15th century. It is a Grade II* listed building.

History

The first church in Chaffcombe is recorded in 1187.

The church was built in the 15th century and tower is still from that period, but the rest of the church was rebuilt between 1857 and 1860 by James Mountford Allen.

The parish is part of the Two Shires benefice within the Diocese of Bath and Wells.

Architecture

The stone building has hamstone dressings and clay tile roofs. It has a three-bay nave, two-bay chancel. The three-stage tower is supported by offset buttresses. The tower contains a peal of six bells. The outside has several gargoyles.

Inside the church are a copy of the Madonna and child by Raphael and an early font which pre-dates the current building. The font is undecorated and stands on a cylindrical stem.

See also  
 List of ecclesiastical parishes in the Diocese of Bath and Wells

References

Grade II* listed buildings in South Somerset
Grade II* listed churches in Somerset
Church of England church buildings in South Somerset